Grace Church Houston is a non-denominational megachurch located in Houston, Texas.

The church currently has three services on Sunday at their main facility (referred to as the Houston Campus): two English-speaking and one Spanish-speaking.

History

 August 1983 - Founding Pastor Steve Riggle, sent on a church-planting mission by the Grace International Churches and Ministries, Inc, held the first service. Twelve people met in the Clear Lake Intermediate School auditorium.
 Late 1983 - Relocation to an existing church building in Webster. By that time, the congregation had grown to 98.
 1984 - Relocation to an existing church building in League City. By that time, the congregation had grown to 400.
 1988 - Even with three services, the League City location was at capacity. Eventually, services had to be held at Clear Brook High School in Friendswood.
 1990 - Relocation to a new facility in Clear Lake City.
 2003 - In the aftermath of the Space Shuttle Columbia disaster, Pastor Riggle was interviewed numerous times by both secular and religiously oriented media. Commander Rick Husband and Payload Commander Mike Anderson were members. 
 2004 - Relocation to a new facility (the South Campus) on  adjacent to the Gulf Freeway. 
 2006 - Groundbreaking for a North Campus in The Woodlands.
 2006 - The interim worship center at the South Campus (1900 seats) reaches capacity in the late service.
 2006 - Dedication of a new South Campus worship center that will hold over 10,000 with a full seat loading (expected in 2007).
 2014- After serving Grace for 20 years in various roles, Garrett and Andrea Booth became the pastors of Grace Houston.   Steve and Becky Riggle transitioned to the role of founding pastors along with pastoring Grace Woodlands and leading Grace International, a world-wide fellowship of churches and ministries.

External links

 Grace Church Houston

Evangelical churches in Houston
Evangelical megachurches in the United States
Megachurches in Texas
Evangelical churches in Texas
Christian organizations established in 1983
Trinity Broadcasting Network
Greater Houston